Pioneer Park is a stadium on the campus of Tusculum University in Greeneville, Tennessee.  It is primarily used for baseball as the home field for the college's baseball team, the Tusculum Pioneers. It was built in 2004, and holds 4,000 people. It is also home to the Greeneville Flyboys of the summer collegiate Appalachian League. It was previously home to the Greeneville Reds Minor League Baseball team of the then-Rookie Appalachian League from 2018 to 2020 and the Greeneville Astros from 2004 to 2017.

References

External links
Pioneer Park Views - Ball Parks of the Minor Leagues

Sports venues in Tennessee
College baseball venues in the United States
Minor league baseball venues
Tusculum Pioneers baseball
Baseball venues in Tennessee
Buildings and structures in Greene County, Tennessee
Tusculum, Tennessee
2004 establishments in Tennessee
Sports venues completed in 2004